The full emblem of Tatmadaw is used as a cap badge, an official seal and a logo.

History

1948–1976 
The first emblem of post-independence Burmese Armed Forces (Bama Tatmadaw) is a derivative work of the State Seal of Burma at that time; the circle of samaggānaṃ tapo sukho from the State seal is replaced by a shield in the Tatmadaw emblem.

1976–1990 

The State seal was changed in 1974, and the Tatmadaw emblem was changed a few years later (not immediately). The then new emblem is with a red map of the country surrounded by cogwheel and paddy ears headed by a star (which are also the ones added to the State seal). Instead of using the name of the country, the Tatmadaw started to include its motto on its emblem. It also excluded the lions which was included in the former one.

Gallery

See also 

 State Seal of Myanmar
 Military ranks of Myanmar

References 

Military of Myanmar
Military heraldry
Military insignia